Tobias Knoflach (born 30 December 1993) is an Austrian professional  footballer who plays for Romanian Liga II club Politehnica Iași.

Career
On 22 October 2021, he signed for Serie D club Sambenedettese.

In August 2022, he left Sambenedettese to join Romanian Liga II club Politehnica Iași.

References

1993 births
Footballers from Vienna
Living people
Austrian footballers
Association football goalkeepers
SK Rapid Wien players
A.S. Sambenedettese players
FC Politehnica Iași (2010) players
Austrian Football Bundesliga players
Serie D players
Liga II players
Austrian expatriate footballers
Expatriate footballers in Italy
Austrian expatriate sportspeople in Italy
Expatriate footballers in Romania
Austrian expatriate sportspeople in Romania